Klubi Futbollit Maliqi is an Albanian football club based in Maliq, Korçë County. The club was founded in the 1950s and has played its home games at the Jovan Asko Stadium. The play in the Kategoria e Dytë, which is the third tier of football in the country.

Current squad

References

 
Maliqi
Maliq
Kategoria e Dytë clubs